Live in Japan is a 2001 live album by German-British avant-pop group Slapp Happy, recorded in Tokyo, Sapporo and Kyoto, Japan in May 2000. They performed without any backing musicians and played all the instruments themselves. Material for this album was drawn from four of their studio albums, Sort Of, Slapp Happy/Acnalbasac Noom, Desperate Straights and Ça Va.

A free bonus single "Coralie" was given to subscribers of the album.

Track listing

Personnel
Anthony Moore – keyboards, guitar, vocals, harmonica, shaker
Peter Blegvad – guitar, vocals, percussion, harmonica
Dagmar Krause – vocals, percussion, keyboards, harmonica

Production
Recorded live in May 2000 at Star Pine's Cafe in Tokyo, at Bessie Hall in Sapporo, and at Seibu Auditorium in Kyoto.
Anthony Moore – edited, mixed and mastered
Peter Blegvad – art direction and lettering on the disk
Kazuhiro Nishiwaki – illustration and lettering on the cover
Toshi Ota – photography

References

External links
Peter Blegvad Discography

Slapp Happy albums
2001 live albums
Avant-pop albums